Peppermint (Mentha × piperita) is a hybrid species of mint, a cross between watermint and spearmint. Indigenous to Europe and the Middle East, the plant is now widely spread and cultivated in many regions of the world. It is occasionally found in the wild with its parent species.

Although the genus Mentha comprises more than 25 species, the one in most common use is peppermint. While Western peppermint is derived from Mentha ×  piperita, Chinese peppermint, or bohe, is derived from the fresh leaves of M. haplocalyx. M. ×  piperita and M. haplocalyx are both recognized as plant sources of menthol and menthone, and are among the oldest herbs used for both culinary and medicinal products.

Botany

Peppermint was first described in 1753 by Carl Linnaeus from specimens that had been collected in England; he treated it as a species, but it is now universally agreed to be a hybrid.
The rhizomes are wide-spreading and fleshy, and bear fibrous roots. They are dark green with reddish veins, with an acute apex and coarsely toothed margins. The leaves and stems are usually slightly fuzzy. Flowering season lasts from mid- to late summer. The chromosome number is variable, with 2n counts of 66, 72, 84, and 120 recorded. Peppermint is a fast-growing plant; once it sprouts, it spreads very quickly.

Ecology
Peppermint typically occurs in moist habitats, including stream sides and drainage ditches. Being a hybrid, it is usually sterile, producing no seeds and reproducing only vegetatively, spreading by its runners.

Outside of its native range, areas where peppermint was formerly grown for oil often have an abundance of feral plants, and it is considered invasive in Australia, the Galápagos Islands, New Zealand, and the United States in the Great Lakes region, noted since 1843.

Cultivation

Peppermint generally grows best in moist, shaded locations, and expands by underground rhizomes. Young shoots are taken from old stocks and dibbled into the ground about 0.5 m (1.5 ft) apart.  They grow quickly and cover the ground with runners if it is permanently moist.  For the home gardener, it is often grown in containers to restrict rapid spreading. It grows best with a good supply of water, without being water-logged, and planted in areas with partial sun to shade.

The leaves and flowering tops are used; they are collected as soon as the flowers begin to open and can be dried. The wild form of the plant is less suitable for this purpose, with cultivated plants having been selected for more and better oil content. They may be allowed to lie and wilt a little before distillation, or they may be taken directly to the still.

Cultivars 
Several cultivars have been selected for garden use:

 Mentha × piperita 'Candymint' has reddish stems.
 Mentha × piperita 'Chocolate Mint'. Its flowers open from the bottom up; its flavour is reminiscent of the flavour in Andes Chocolate Mints, a popular confection.
 Mentha × piperita 'Citrata' includes a number of varieties including 'eau de Cologne' mint, grapefruit mint, lemon mint, and orange mint. Its leaves are aromatic and hairless.
 Mentha × piperita 'Crispa' has wrinkled leaves.
 Mentha × piperita 'Lavender Mint'
 Mentha × piperita 'Lime Mint' has lime-scented foliage.
 Mentha × piperita 'Variegata' has mottled green and pale yellow leaves.

Commercial cultivars may include:
 Dulgo pole
 Zefir
 Bulgarian population #2
 Clone 11-6-22
 Clone 80-121-33
 Mitcham Digne 38
 Mitcham Ribecourt 19
 'Todd's Mitcham', a verticillium wilt-resistant cultivar produced from a breeding and test program of atomic gardening at Brookhaven National Laboratory from the mid-1950s
 'Refined Murray', also verticillium-resistant
 'Roberts Mitcham', also verticillium-resistant and also the product of mutation breeding

Diseases 
Verticillium wilt is a major constraint in peppermint cultivation. 'Todd's Mitcham', 'Refined Murray', 'Roberts Mitcham' (see above), and a few other cultivars have some degree of resistance.

Production

In 2020, world production of peppermint was 48,437 tonnes, led by Morocco with 83% of the world total and Argentina with 14% (table). 

In the United States, Oregon and Washington produce most of the country's peppermint, the leaves of which are processed for the essential oil to produce flavorings mainly for chewing gum and toothpaste.

Chemical constituents
Peppermint has a high menthol content. The essential oil also contains menthone and carboxyl esters, particularly menthyl acetate. Dried peppermint typically has 0.3–0.4% of volatile oil containing menthol (7–48%), menthone (20–46%), menthyl acetate (3–10%), menthofuran (1–17%), and 1,8-cineol (3–6%).  Peppermint oil also contains small amounts of many additional compounds, including limonene, pulegone, caryophyllene, and pinene.

Peppermint contains terpenoids and flavonoids such as eriocitrin, hesperidin, and kaempferol 7-O-rutinoside.

Oil
Peppermint oil has a high concentration of natural pesticides, mainly pulegone (found mainly in M. arvensis var. piperascens  (cornmint, field mint, or Japanese mint), and to a lesser extent (6,530 ppm) in Mentha × piperita subsp. notho) and menthone. It is known to repel some pest insects, including mosquitos, and has uses in organic gardening. It is also widely used to repel rodents.

Peppermint oil can also be used as an effective remedy for nausea and digestive issues.

The chemical composition of the essential oil from peppermint (Mentha × piperita L.) was analyzed by GC/FID and GC-MS. The main constituents were menthol (40.7%) and menthone (23.4%). Further components were (±)-menthyl acetate, 1,8-cineole, limonene, beta-pinene, and beta-caryophyllene.

Research and health effects
Peppermint oil is under preliminary research for its potential as a short-term treatment for irritable bowel syndrome, and has supposed uses in traditional medicine for minor ailments. Peppermint oil and leaves have a cooling effect when used topically for muscle pain, nerve pain, relief from itching, or as a fragrance. High oral doses of peppermint oil (500 mg) can cause mucosal irritation and mimic heartburn.

Peppermint roots bioaccumulate radium, so the plant may be effective for phytoremediation of radioactively contaminated soil.

Culinary and other uses
Fresh or dried peppermint leaves are often used alone in peppermint tea or with other herbs in herbal teas (tisanes, infusions). Peppermint is used for flavouring ice cream, candy, fruit preserves, alcoholic beverages, chewing gum, toothpaste, and some shampoos, soaps, and skin care products.

Menthol activates cold-sensitive TRPM8 receptors in the skin and mucosal tissues, and is the primary source of the cooling sensation that follows the topical application of peppermint oil.

Peppermint oil is also used in construction and plumbing to test for the tightness of pipes and disclose leaks by its odor.

Safety 
Medicinal uses of peppermint have not been approved as effective or safe by the US Food and Drug Administration.  With caution that the concentration of the peppermint constituent pulegone should not exceed 1% (140 mg), peppermint preparations are considered safe by the European Medicines Agency when used in topical formulations for adult subjects. Diluted peppermint essential oil is safe for oral intake when only a few drops are used.

Although peppermint is commonly available as a herbal supplement,  no established, consistent manufacturing standards exist for it, and some peppermint products may be contaminated with toxic metals or other substituted compounds. Skin rashes, irritation, or allergic reactions may result from applying peppermint oil to the skin, and its use on the face or chest of young children may cause side effects if the oil menthol is inhaled. A common side effect from oral intake of peppermint oil or capsules is heartburn. Oral use of peppermint products may have adverse effects when used with iron supplements, cyclosporine, medicines for heart conditions or high blood pressure, or medicines to decrease stomach acid.

Standardization 
 ISO 676:1995—contains the information about the nomenclature of the variety and cultivars
 ISO 5563:1984—a specification for its dried leaves of Mentha piperita Linnaeus
 Peppermint oil—ISO 856:2006

See also 

 Eucalyptus
 Peppermint extract

References

Antiemetics
Flora of Europe
Herbs
Medicinal plants
Mentha
Plants described in 1753
Hybrid plants